Justice N Anand Venkatesh is a sitting Judge of the Charted High Court of Madras.

Early life 
N Anand Venkatesh was born on 4 July 1969. He studied in St. Mary’s School at Perambur. He graduated with Bachelor of Commerce from A.M. Jain College, Meenambakkam and Bachelor of Law from Ambedkar Law college, Chennai.

Judge of High Court 
The Collegium headed by Chief Justice of India S K Kaul recommended the appointment of N Anand Venkatesh as an Additional Judge of Madras High Court on 19 December 2016. The recommendation was cleared by the Supreme Court collegium in December 2017 and he was appointed on 4 June 2018.

The Collegium headed by Chief Justice of India S A Bobde in a meeting held on 12 February 2020 approved the appointment of N Anand Venkatesh as Permanent Judge of Madras High Court.

Notable judgments

LGBTQ Rights

S Sushma v. Commissioner of Police 

On 28 April 2021, Madras High Court Justice N Anand Venkatesh passed an interim order in response to a petition filed by two young women with same sex orientation. According to the order, in an unprecedented move, he decided to undergo psycho-education before penning a judgment on same sex relationships.Judge said that psyhco-educative counseling on queer issues helped him shed his personal ignorance and prejudices. He clearly stated in the judgment that the responsibility to change, the burden of unlearning stigma, and learning about the lived experience of the queer community lies on the society and not the queer individuals.

The court recognized that there’s an absence of a specific law to protect the interests of queer people and acknowledged it is the responsibility of the constitutional courts to fill this vacuum with necessary directions to ensure the protection of such couples from harassment sourced from stigma and prejudices.

On 7 June 2021, in delivering the verdict on this case, Justice N Anand Venkatesh prohibited Conversion Therapy. He suggested comprehensive measures to sensitize the society and various branches of the State including the Police and judiciary to remove prejudices against the LGBTQIA+ community. He suggested that changes be made to the curricula of schools and universities to educate students on understanding the LGBTQIA+ community.

"This Court is unable to understand the need for such a knee-jerk reaction within hours of the material getting uploaded on the website. If someone really had a grievance, the same should have been addressed in a proper manner through proper consultation and meetings, and no one can be allowed to arm-twist a State-run council into forcibly withdrawing a material that came out after a long study by a committee."

— Justice N Anand Venkatesh, about the withdrawal of the NCERT report on gender non-conforming and transgender children from its official website.The report titled 'Inclusion of Transgender Children in School Education: Concerns and Roadmap' was taken down within hours of its publishing, owing to external pressure.

The report, which was meant as training material for educators at schools, was removed from the site after the NCPCR (National Commission for Protection of Child Rights) sent a notice to the NCERT against the manual following complaints raised against the material from certain sections.

Justice N Anand Venkatesh, on addressing the needs of transgender children and those with binary identities, noted that sensitization has to start from schools and home, and without family support, children belonging to the community would never be able to get support elsewhere. The court reasoned that the report of an expert body cannot be disregarded due to opposition from a few quarters that still hesitate to recognize the LGBTQIA+ Community.

The judge directed the NCERT to submit its report on the issue before the court on 23 December.

References

External links 
 

Judges of the Madras High Court
Judges of the High Courts of India
Indian judges
1969 births
Living people